Coor-Gaston House, also known as the Judge William Gaston House, is a historic home located at New Bern, Craven County, North Carolina.  It was built in 1774, as determined by dendrochronology, and is a -story, "L"-plan, Georgian style frame dwelling with a gable roof. It features a two-tier porch enclosed by Chinese trellis railings and supported by Doric order pillars.  It was the home of Congressman and jurist William Gaston (1778-1844).

It was listed on the National Register of Historic Places in 1972.

James Coor (17371795) built the house soon after 1767.  After his death it was owned by his heirs until bought by William Gaston in 1818.

References

External links

Historic American Buildings Survey in North Carolina
Houses on the National Register of Historic Places in North Carolina
Georgian architecture in North Carolina
Houses completed in 1767
Houses in New Bern, North Carolina
National Register of Historic Places in Craven County, North Carolina
1767 establishments in North Carolina